New Zealand national politics have featured a pervasive party system since the early 20th century. Usually, all members of Parliament's unicameral House of Representatives belong to a political party. Independent MPs do not occur often.

While two major parties (namely Labour and National) have dominated the New Zealand national political landscape since the 1930s, the introduction of proportional representation in 1996 led to a multi-party system, such that smaller parties have substantial representation in Parliament and can now reasonably expect to gain seats in government. , five parties have MPs in the 53rd Parliament.

History
New Zealand's party system did not arise until the late 19th century. Prior to this, members of Parliament stood as independent candidates, and while some MPs joined factions, these typically were formed around prominent individuals such as Julius Vogel, and did so after election not before.

The Liberal Party, which was formed in 1891, was New Zealand's first 'modern' political party. It was the country's sole political party until the formation of the more conservative Reform Party in 1909. The Labour Party was founded in 1916, and by 1919 these three parties dominated New Zealand politics.

The Liberal Party was succeeded by the United Party in 1928. The United and Reform parties found themselves working together more often, and they formed a coalition in 1931. After Labour won office in 1935, United and Reform formally amalgamated in 1936 to form the National Party. The first-past-the-post (FPP) plurality voting system (in use before the 1990s) entrenched a two-party system, since the two major parties usually won far more seats than their share of the overall vote.

Over the years, a number of third parties or so-called minor parties developed, notably the Social Credit Party, the New Zealand Party, the Values Party, and the Alliance. However, the FPP electoral system meant that regardless of how many votes a party gained nationwide, it could not win a seat without a plurality in a particular electorate. For example, the Social Credit Party won over 11% of the votes cast in the 1954 election but did not have a plurality in any electorate so won no seats. Similarly, in the 1984 election, the New Zealand Party received over 12% of the votes cast but also won no seats. Under such conditions, minor parties mostly performed poorly in terms of making an impact in Parliament.

In 1993, the Electoral Act 1993 was passed, introducing the mixed-member proportional (MMP) electoral system for the 1996 election. Now, any party that won at least 5% of the party vote entered Parliament, as well as the previous electorate pathway. This made it much easier for smaller parties to enter Parliament, but more difficult to gain elected as a non-party independent. Since then New Zealand has been a multi-party system, with at least five parties elected in every election since.

Registration of parties
Political parties in New Zealand can be either registered or unregistered. Registered parties must have five-hundred paying members, each eligible to vote in general elections, and party membership rules.

If a party registers, it may submit a party list, enabling it to receive party votes in New Zealand's MMP electoral system. Unregistered parties can only nominate candidates for individual electorates.

, registered political parties are also able to spend up to $1,169,000 during the campaign for the party vote and $27,500 per electorate seat. Unregistered entities are able to spend up to $330,000 on general election advertising.

Current parties

Parties represented in Parliament
There are five parliamentary parties in the 53rd New Zealand Parliament. The default order of this list corresponds to the number of MPs they currently have.

Registered parties outside Parliament
Parties listed in alphabetical order:

Unregistered parties
An accurate list of active unregistered parties can be difficult to determine. Any person may announce a political party, but these parties may or may not gain followers, receive any media coverage or go on to contest an election. It can also be difficult to determine when parties have ceased operating or moved away from politics.

The list below lists active and notable parties.

Historical parties

Parties that held seats

Parties that never held seats
Because New Zealand does not require political parties to be registered, any person can announce a political party, though may not receive media coverage or go on to contest an election. It can also be difficult to determine when such parties have ceased operating or moved away from politics. The list below is limited to notable parties understood to no longer be operating.

Parties listed by date of founding:

See also
 Politics of New Zealand
 Political funding in New Zealand
 List of political parties by country
 Socialism in New Zealand
 Liberalism in New Zealand

References

External links
 NZ Political Parties
 Elections New Zealand (more information on the election systems)

 
Political parties
New Zealand
New Zealand
Political parties